Suhagi is a census town in Jabalpur district in the Indian state of Madhya Pradesh.

Demographics
 India census, Suhagi had a population of 8,371. Males constitute 53% of the population and females 47%. Suhagi has an average literacy rate of 44%, lower than the national average of 59.5%: male literacy is 62%, and female literacy is 24%. In Suhagi, 12% of the population is under 6 years of age.

References

Cities and towns in Jabalpur district